The 2015 FIBA U16 Women's European Championship Division B was the 12th edition of the Division B of the European basketball championship for women's national under-16 teams. It was played in Ohrid and Struga, Republic of Macedonia, from 13 to 23 August 2015. Lithuania women's national under-16 basketball team won the tournament.

Participating teams

  (15th place, 2014 FIBA Europe Under-16 Championship for Women Division A)

  (14th place, 2014 FIBA Europe Under-16 Championship for Women Division A)

  (1st place, 2014 FIBA Europe Under-16 Championship for Women Division C)

  (16th place, 2014 FIBA Europe Under-16 Championship for Women Division A)

First round
In the first round, the teams were drawn into four groups of five. The first two teams from each group will advance to the Quarterfinal Groups E and F, the third and fourth teams will advance to the 9th–16th place classification (Groups G and H), the last teams will play in the 17th–20th place classification (Group I).

Group A

Group B

Group C

Group D

1st–8th place classification

Group E

Group F

9th–16th place classification

Group G

Group H

17th–20th place classification

Group I

13th–16th place playoffs

9th–12th place playoffs

5th–8th place playoffs

Championship playoffs

Final standings

References

External links
FIBA official website

2015
2015–16 in European women's basketball
International youth basketball competitions hosted by North Macedonia
Sport in Ohrid
Sport in Struga
FIBA U16
August 2015 sports events in Europe